Mahatma Vidur is a Bollywood mythological film based on the life of Vidura. It was directed by Parshwanath Yeshwant Altekar and released in 1943.

Cast
 Durga Khote
 Raja Sandow P.K.
 Vishnupant Pagnis
 Baby Madhuri

References

External links
 

1943 films
1940s Hindi-language films
Indian drama films
Indian black-and-white films
1943 drama films
Hindi-language drama films